Gervonta Davis vs. Ryan Garcia is an upcoming catchweight professional boxing match contested between WBA (Regular) lightweight champion Gervonta Davis, and former WBC interim lightweight champion Ryan Garcia. The bout is scheduled to take place at a catchweight of 136 lbs on April 22, 2023 at T-Mobile Arena in Las Vegas, Nevada.

Fight card

Broadcasting

References 

2023 in boxing
Boxing matches
April 2023 sports events in the United States
Boxing in Nevada
Simulcasts
Boxing on Showtime
DAZN